Cylindera unipunctata, the one-spotted tiger beetle, is a species of flashy tiger beetle in the family Carabidae. It is found in North America.

References

Further reading

External links

 

unipunctata
Articles created by Qbugbot
Beetles described in 1775
Taxa named by Johan Christian Fabricius